František Kůrka (26 September 1903 – 19 June 1952) was a Czech water polo player. He competed in the men's tournament at the 1924 Summer Olympics.

References

External links
 

1903 births
1952 deaths
Czechoslovak male water polo players
Olympic water polo players of Czechoslovakia
Water polo players at the 1924 Summer Olympics
Sportspeople from Prague